The 4th Best of Nollywood Awards was held at Tafawa Balewa Square Auditorium in Lagos, Nigeria. A total of 32 awards were given out to practitioners of the Nigerian film industry. The ceremony was co-hosted by Nollywood actor Nonso Diobi and former Most Beautiful Girl in Nigeria, Sylvia Nduka.

References

2012 film awards
2012 in Nigerian cinema
2012
Culture in Lagos State
21st century in Lagos